Wielki Krzek (formerly ) is a Polish (formerly German) island in the Szczecin Lagoon, near Wolin, at the mouth of Świna, east of Karsibór. Wielki Krzek is uninhabited and is under natural protection on account of its many species of animals.

Uninhabited islands of Poland
Landforms of West Pomeranian Voivodeship